This is a list of urban agglomerations in Asia by population. An urban area (built-up urban area or urban agglomeration) is fundamentally different from a metropolitan area. A metropolitan area is a labor market (and a housing market). It includes a principal built-up urban area (the largest built-up urban area in the metropolitan area) as well as economically connected rural areas (and smaller urban areas) to the outside.

See also

References

Cities in Asia